Kukës District was one of the 36 districts of Albania, which were dissolved in July 2000 and replaced by 12 counties. The town of Kukës was where the district's administrative headquarters were located.

Administrative divisions
The district consisted of the following municipalities:

Arrën
Bicaj
Bushtricë
Grykë-Çaje
Kalis
Kolsh
Kukës
Malzi
Shishtavec
Shtiqën
Surroj
Tërthorë
Topojan
Ujmisht
Zapod

Note: - urban municipalities in bold

Geography
The district lies in the northeastern part of Albania and is bordered by District of Prizren in the east and northeast, by Has District in the north, by Pukë District and Mirditë District in the west and by Dibër District in the south.

References

Districts of Albania
Geography of Kukës County